Curtis White (born September 28, 1995 in Schenectady, New York, United States) is an American professional cyclist, who currently rides for UCI Continental team . He is the brother of former racing cyclist Emma White.

Major results

Cyclo-cross

2012–2013
 2nd National Junior Championships
2014–2015
 1st  Pan American Under-23 Championships
 1st Rounds 5, 7 & 8 Verge NECXS
2015–2016
 1st Rounds 1 & 2, Charm City Cross
 2nd  Pan American Under-23 Championships
2016–2017
 1st  Pan American Under-23 Championships
 1st Rounds 1 & 2, CRAFT Sportswear Gran Prix of Gloucester
 1st Rounds 1 & 2, NBX Gran Prix of Cross
 1st Rounds 1 & 2, The Cycle-Smart Northampton International
 1st Round 2, Supercross Cup UCI Weekend
 1st Round 2, KMC Cyclo-Cross Festival
2017–2018
 1st Overall Vittoria Northeast Series
1st Northampton Day 1
1st Northampton Day 2
1st Suffern Day 2
2nd Suffern Day 1
2nd Warwick Day 1
3rd Warwick Day 2
3rd Gloucester Day 2
 US Cup
3rd Thompson, Connecticut Day 2
3rd Cincinnati
2018–2019
 1st  Pan American Championships
 1st Overall Vittoria Northeast Series
1st Gloucester Day 1
1st Gloucester Day 2
1st Northampton Day 1
1st Northampton Day 2
1st Suffern Day 1
1st Suffern Day 2
 2nd National Championships
 2nd Broken Arrow Day 1
 2nd Broken Arrow Day 2
 2nd Warwick Day 1
 2nd Breinigsville Day 2
 3rd Baltimore Day 2
 3rd Breinigsville Day 1
 3rd Warwick Day 2
2019–2020
 Vittoria Northeast Series
1st Suffern Day 1
1st Suffern Day 2
 1st Really Rad Festival Day 1
 1st Really Rad Festival Day 2
 1st Mason Day 2
 1st Rochester Day 2
 1st Baltimore Day 2
 1st Fayetteville Day 2
 1st Roanoke Day 1
 2nd Baltimore Day 1
 2nd Roanoke Day 2
 2nd  Pan American Championships
 2nd National Championships
 3rd Fayetteville Day 1
 3rd Mason Day 1
2020–2021
 3rd National Championships
2021–2022
 1st Overall New England Series
1st Northampton Day 1
1st Northampton Day 2
2nd Falmouth Day 1
2nd Falmouth Day 2
 1st Roanoke Day 1
 1st Roanoke Day 2
 2nd  Pan American Championships
 2nd National Championships
 USCX Series
2nd Baltimore Day 2
2nd Mason Day 2
3rd Mason Day 1
2022–2023
 USCX Series
1st Baltimore Day 2
2nd Rochester Day 1
2nd Rochester Day 2
3rd Roanoke Day 2
3rd Baltimore Day 1

Road

2016
 1st Prologue Tour Alsace
 1st Stage 1 Fitchburg Longsjo Classic
2017
 1st Rochester Twilight Criterium
2018
 1st Stage 2 Fitchburg Longsjo Classic

References

External links

1995 births
Living people
American male cyclists
Cyclo-cross cyclists